Moritz Wagner may refer to:

 Moritz Wagner (basketball) (born 1997), German professional basketball player
 Moritz Wagner (naturalist) (1813–1887), German explorer, naturalist and geographer